Thomas Flanagan (born 3 July 1965) is a Scottish actor. He is best known for his role as Filip "Chibs" Telford in the FX crime drama television series Sons of Anarchy (2008–2014) and its spin-off Mayans M.C. (2019), Cicero in Gladiator (2000), Morrison in Braveheart (1995), Tullk in Guardians of the Galaxy Vol. 2 (2017), and Williamson in All About the Benjamins (2002).

Life
Flanagan was born in Easterhouse, Glasgow, the second of four children. His sister Sue is a nurse at Queen Elizabeth Hospital in Glasgow. He was an altar boy. His facial scars are the result of a knife attack outside a nightclub where he had been working as a DJ. After leaving the club he was attacked by a gang, stabbed and slashed with a knife, leaving him with scars.

Flanagan and his wife, Dina, have a daughter. He was previously married to Rachel Flanagan, and casting director Jane Ford.

Career
His first television roles were in Screen One (1992) and Taggart (1993). Flanagan worked in Robert Carlyle's Raindog Theatre for three years before being cast in Braveheart (1995). He has had roles in Face/Off (1997), The Game (1997), Sunset Strip (2000), Gladiator (2000), All About the Benjamins (2002), Charlie's Angels: Full Throttle (2003), Alien vs. Predator (2004), Sin City (2005), Smokin' Aces (2006), When a Stranger Calls (2006), The Last Drop (2006), Smokin' Aces 2: Assassins' Ball (2010), Guardians of the Galaxy Vol. 2 (2017) and the TV mini-series Attila.

He portrayed arms dealer Gabriel Schecter in the first episode of 24s seventh season and appeared in the episode "Headlock" of Lie to Me, aired in the U.S. on Monday 2 August 2010. He was one of the main cast members of Sons of Anarchy, in which he plays an outlaw biker named Filip "Chibs" Telford. In October 2010, Flanagan was revealed as the spokesperson for the Scottish soft drink Irn-Bru. In July 2016, he appeared in the music video for the song "Rotting in Vain" by Korn.

In July 2018, it was announced that Flanagan was cast in one of the main roles, Alec McCullough, on the Netflix series Wu Assassins.

In 2022, he was cast as Walter Flynn for the Starz series Power Book IV: Force.

Filmography

Film

Television

References

External links

1965 births
Male actors from Glasgow
Living people
Scottish male film actors
Scottish male television actors